Peek & Cloppenburg is an international chain of department stores from Germany. The chain is operated by two separate and independent companies, Peek & Cloppenburg KG Düsseldorf (known as P&C West) and Peek & Cloppenburg KG Hamburg (known as P&C North).

History

Peek & Cloppenburg has its origins in the relationship between Johann Theodor Peek (1845–1907) and Heinrich Anton Adolph Cloppenburg (1844–1922), both from the Cloppenburg area of Lower Saxony, Grand Duchy of Oldenburg, now part of Germany. In or before 1868 the men met as trainees at manufacturing companies in Zwolle and Rotterdam in the Netherlands where they visited clients in surrounding villages.

In 1869 they established a business together in Rotterdam.

A second store was opened the following year in Utrecht. Both men moved to Düsseldorf in Germany and on 20 April 1900, they founded "Peek et Cloppenburg GmbH"  in that city. A short time after the company was formed they opened their first store in the center of Düsseldorf. James Cloppenburg, son of founder Anton Adolph Cloppenburg, opened the company's second store in 1901 in Berlin. Barely 20 years after the founding of the trading house in Rotterdam, there were already branches in Amsterdam, The Hague, Breda, Leeuwarden, Groningen, Haarlem, Leiden and Utrecht.

Foundation in Germany 
Peek & Cloppenburg was founded in Düsseldorf in March 1901. This was followed in the same year by the opening of the first sales outlet in Düsseldorf at Schadowstrasse 31–33. To mark the company's 100th birthday, a new building designed by the New York architect Richard Meier was opened on this site with a sales area of around 14,200 square metres. Like all buildings by Richard Meier, this building also bears a white façade.

A short time later, also in 1901, James Cloppenburg, the son of Heinrich Cloppenburg and son-in-law of Johann Theodor Peek, opened the second German sales house in Berlin at Gertraudenstrasse, corner Roßstrasse 26–27. This was initially independent; the Peek family was not involved. Later (in 1911 at the latest) he brought the Berlin house into his father's company and took over the management of the entire firm.

Peek & Cloppenburg introduced the uniform size system in menswear as a novelty in its first two shops.

Internationally
The two independent Peek & Cloppenburg partnerships trade in 15 countries in Europe.

Peek & Cloppenburg Düsseldorf
Peek & Cloppenburg KG Düsseldorf runs two stores in Belgium, four in the Netherlands, and two in Switzerland, in addition to its 67 stores in Germany. A subsidiary company, Peek & Cloppenburg KG Wien (Vienna), runs 43 stores in Austria, Bulgaria, Croatia, the Czech Republic, Hungary, Latvia, Lithuania, Poland, Romania, Slovakia, Serbia and Slovenia.

Magasin du Nord 
In May 2021, Peek & Cloppenburg acquired Danish department store chain Magasin du Nord from British retailer Debenhams in a £120 million deal.

Brands
Both Peek & Cloppenburg Düsseldorf and Peek & Cloppenburg Hamburg sell designer and own-brand fashion for men, women, teens, and children.
The brands McNeal (men's fashion) and Review (young fashion for men and women) have ties to the Cloppenburg family of Peek & Cloppenburg KG Düsseldorf. The two sub-brands are also sold outside of P&C in competitors' stores and have their own shops in Austria, Croatia, and Germany.

Logo
The Peek & Cloppenburg logo consists of a shield with the white letters "P" and "C" on it.
The shield is divided into two colours. The left side is dark red and the right side is dark blue.
Peek & Cloppenburg Hamburg has a white "&"-sign between the two letters.
Peek & Cloppenburg Düsseldorf has a white small letter "u" for the word "und" (meaning and) between the two letters.

Facts 
One son of founder Cloppenburg, James Cloppenburg (1877–1926), entered the business in 1901 and opened the second store in Berlin, Germany. The other (younger) son, Anton Cloppenburg, married the daughter of founder Johann Theodor Peek, Marie Peek (1879–1937) in 1901. Ten years later Anton Cloppenburg founded a separate private partnership of Peek & Cloppenburg in Hamburg in 1911. From this date, the Cloppenburg family was divided into the companies operating under the same name.

References 

Retail companies of the Netherlands
Clothing retailers of Germany
Companies based in Düsseldorf
Retail companies established in 1900
1900 establishments in Germany